Săftoiu is a Romanian language surname. Notable people with the surname include:

Adriana Săftoiu (born 1967), Romanian journalist and politician
Claudiu Săftoiu (born 1968), Romanian journalist, former husband of Adriana

Romanian-language surnames